Tantardini is an Italian surname. Notable people with the surname include: 

 Felice Tantardini (1898–1991), Italian Roman Catholic religious brother
 Riccardo Tantardini (born 1993), Italian footballer

Italian-language surnames